Kadkan Rural District is a rural district (dehestan) in Kadkan District, Torbat-e Heydarieh County, Razavi Khorasan Province, Iran. At the 2006 census, its population was 5,107, in 1,204 families.  The rural district has 5 villages.

References 

Rural Districts of Razavi Khorasan Province
Torbat-e Heydarieh County